Luke Scanlon (born 2 June 1996) is an Irish hurler who plays as a Goalkeeper for the Kilkenny senior team.

Born in Kilkenny, Scanlon first played competitive hurling at CBS Kilkenny, winning back-to-back Leinster medals in 2013 and 2014. He simultaneously came to prominence at juvenile and underage levels with the James Stephens club, winning a minor championship medal in 2012. Scanlon subsequently joined the James Stephens senior team.

Scanlon made his debut on the inter-county scene at the age of sixteen when he was selected for the Kilkenny minor team. He enjoyed two championship seasons with the minor team, culminating with the winning of an All-Ireland medal in 2014. He subsequently joined the Kilkenny intermediate team, winning an All-Ireland medal in 2016 before winning a Leinster medal with the under-21 team in 2017. Scanlan joined the Kilkenny senior team as a member of the extended training panel in 2017 and made his debut during the 2018 Walsh Cup.

Career statistics

Honours

CBS Kilkenny
Leinster Colleges Senior Hurling Championship (2): 2013, 2014

James Stephens
Kilkenny Minor Hurling Championship (1): 2012

Kilkenny
National Hurling League (1): 2018
All-Ireland Intermediate Hurling Championship (1): 2016
Leinster Intermediate Hurling Championship (1): 2016
Leinster Under-21 Hurling Championship (1): 2017
All-Ireland Minor Hurling Championship (1): 2014
Leinster Minor Hurling Championship (1): 2013, 2014

References

1996 births
Living people
James Stephens hurlers
Kilkenny inter-county hurlers